Gittruper See is a lake in Münsterland, North Rhine-Westphalia, Germany.

Lakes of North Rhine-Westphalia